The men's 5000 metres at the 1934 European Athletics Championships was held in Turin, Italy, at the  Stadio Benito Mussolini on 9 September 1934.

Medalists

Results

Final
9 September

Participation
According to an unofficial count, 13 athletes from 10 countries participated in the event.

 (1)
 (1)
 (2)
 (1)
 (2)
 (2)
 (1)
 (1)
 (1)
 (1)

References

5000
5000 metres at the European Athletics Championships